Rodríguez Ballón International Airport is an airport serving Arequipa, the capital of Arequipa Region and Peru's second largest city. This airport and Cusco's Alejandro Velasco Astete International Airport are the main air hubs in southern Peru. It is named for early Peruvian aviator Alfredo Rodríguez Ballón (es).

It is the main air gateway for tourists visiting the city of Arequipa, nearby ruins, and the Colca Canyon, the world's second deepest canyon (only behind Cotahuasi Canyon, also in Arequipa). The airport's passenger traffic has grown very rapidly since the airport was granted in concession as part of 6 airports in the southern part of Peru to Aeropuertos Andinos del Perú (es). As of the end of 2017 passenger traffic was 1,689,921 as reported by CORPAC, Peru's national airport corporation. The current terminal has already excedeed its planned capacity (around 1.5 million passengers) and it is expected that the airport will reach 2 million passengers on or before the year 2020.

The runway is paved its entire length, which includes a  displaced threshold on Runway 28. The airport is currently operated by the consortium "Aeropuertos Andinos", who reshuffled and modernized the existing facilities. 
The installation of two boarding jetbridges and the expansion of the main hall, are among the work carried out by the consortium. The hall and the first jetbridge entered in operation on 20 September 2013.
The airport handles domestic flights from Cusco, Lima, Piura, Tarapoto and Trujillo; and an international fight from Santiago, Chile. 
It's a secondary base for airline JetSmart Perú.

Airlines and destinations

Passenger traffic information

Airport expansion

The original airport was inaugurated in 1979 and its design considered a maximum capacity of 500,000 passengers per year, in 2011 the airport was given in concession to Aeropuertos Andinos del Perú for 25 years, even at that time the main terminal was operating at more than twice its planned capacity, the infrastructure was obsolete and neglected, part of the concession agreement required the airport operator to upgrade and expand the facilities.

Phase 1 upgrade and expansion

By 2011 the original airport terminal area was around 4,000 sq meters (42,000 sq ft) and the airport had already exceeded over one million passengers per year (twice its planned capacity), the airport's infrastructure looked old and was inadequate for the needs of the city. During 2013 the airport was expanded and remodeled in order to accommodate increased passenger traffic and to provide better services to passengers. The main goals for this expansion consisted in building a perimeter wall to improve security, the construction of 2 departure gates and installation of 2 jetbridges in the second floor of the airport, some aesthetic improvements (new facade), handicap access, and other minor improvements. In order to alleviate passenger congestion as well as to provide a more modern and secure infrastructure, the airport terminal area was very rapidly increased by more than 50% the original design (6,500 sq mt/70,000 sq ft) at an estimated cost of US$10 Million. Passenger airport capacity was tripled very rapidly in 2013 to around 1.5 million passengers/year which was expected to be reached by the end 2018. In the meanwhile a long term master plan for the airport has been developed that would further expand and remodel the airport.

Phase 2 expansion

Due to increased tourism and overall improvement of the economy by 2015 (only 2 years after the first phase expansion) the airport had once again reached the planned capacity for the Phase 1 expansion, 3 years ahead of schedule, causing passenger congestion, airplane delays and reducing overall operational efficiency, as a result some airlines decided to stop or reduce service to the city, even with the improvements made on Phase 1, the airport today still lacks many services that a more modern airport provides such as shopping areas, food court, business area, VIP Salon, hotels etc.

A second expansion and remodeling is needed, and as per the master plan, the second phase of the airport expansion will include:

 Removing the main runway's displaced threshold by correcting the runway's slope, thus allowing larger aircraft to land in the airport and use the whole length of the main runway (3,000 meters), the removal of the displaced threshold will make Arequipa's airport a true International airport as it will allow for the landing of longer haul aircraft. Runway and installations currently only allows for landing of airplanes as large as Boeing 737-200/Airbus 320, today in case of an extreme emergency the airport would only be able handle a plane as large 747 type aircraft using the whole length of the runway. 
 Improvement and extension of existing taxiways, construction of a waiting area for departing airplanes. 
 Construction of at least 2 additional departure gates (3,000 sq meters or 33,000 sq ft), 
 Addition of 2 or more jetbridges, 
 Increasing the area of existing terminal by 20,000 sq mt or 240,000 sq ft 
 Increasing and improving the existing airplane platform, counter, bag reception and parking areas.

This second airport expansion will increase the total airport terminal area to around 27,000 sq mt (almost 7 times the original terminal area and more than 4.5 times the current terminal area), it will double the amount of counter and ticketing space, thus allowing more airline companies in the airport, it will add more organized and diverse airport services, it will increase airplane departing and parking areas, and it will also add additional automobile parking spaces. This second phase expansion will translate into a maximum airport capacity of around 4.0 million passengers per year. Once construction is completed Arequipa's Airport will be the second largest airport in Peru in terms of terminal area and passenger capacity (at least temporarily until Cuzco's airport is moved to its new location in the Chincheros district).

Construction and remodeling was expected to start in 2019 and conclude sometime in 2020, (plans for the expansion of the existing terminal apparently have been put on hold as the possibility of a new terminal is analyzed). The total cost of the second phase expansion is expected to be between US$40-$60 million, depending on the final goals and requirements of the project.

Phase 3 expansion

Phase 3 expansion is expected to start once airport capacity exceeds 4 million passengers at that time the airport terminal area will be once again doubled to 60,000 sq mt and the main runway will be extended in order to accommodate even larger planes, permitting direct flights to/from North America, Asia and Europe, as a result and once construction is completed, it is expected that the maximum airport passenger capacity will be around 8 million passengers per year, this maximum capacity is expected to be reached on in the future.

Accidents and incidents
On 18 March 1983, Douglas C-47E FAP-356 of the Fuerza Aérea del Perú was damaged beyond repair in an accident at Arequipa Airport.

See also
Transport in Peru
List of airports in Peru

References

External links
Aeropuertos Andinos del Perú
Rodríguez Ballón International Airport at OurAirports

Airports in Peru
Buildings and structures in Arequipa